Grand Haven South Pierhead Inner Light is the inner light of two lighthouses on the south pier of Grand Haven, Michigan where the Grand River enters Lake Michigan. A lighthouse was first lit there in 1839. The lighthouse was put up for sale in 2009 under the National Historic Lighthouse Preservation Act. The City of Grand Haven now owns the pier, but it is maintained by the Army Corps of Engineers.

See also
 Grand Haven South Pierhead Entrance Light

References

External links

Interactive map on Michigan lighthouses, Detroit News
Interactive map of lighthouses in southern Lake Michigan
Lighthouse Friends (Grand Haven Light)
Map of Michigan Lighthouse in PDF Format
Michigan Lighthouse Conservancy, Grand Haven Lighthouse
National Park Service Inventory of Historic Lighthouses, Maritime Heritage, Grand Haven South Pierhead light.
Terry Pepper, Seeing the Light, Grand Haven Pier Light

Wobser, David, boatnerd.com, Grand Haven South Pier and Pierhead Lights

Lighthouses completed in 1905
Lighthouses in Michigan
Buildings and structures in Ottawa County, Michigan
Grand Haven, Michigan
1905 establishments in Michigan